The LS postcode area, also known as the Leeds postcode area, is a group of 29 postcode districts in England, within six post towns. These cover northern West Yorkshire (including Leeds, Wetherby, Pudsey, Otley and Ilkley) and some parts of North Yorkshire (including Tadcaster).

Coverage
The approximate coverage of the postcode districts:

|-
! LS1
| LEEDS
| Leeds city centre
| Leeds
|-
! LS2
| LEEDS
| Leeds city centre, Woodhouse
| Leeds
|-
! LS3
| LEEDS
| Burley, Woodhouse
| Leeds 
|-
! LS4
| LEEDS
| Burley, Kirkstall
| Leeds
|-
! LS5
| LEEDS
| Hawksworth, Kirkstall
| Leeds
|-
! LS6
| LEEDS
| Beckett Park, Burley, Headingley, Hyde Park, Meanwood, Woodhouse
| Leeds
|-
! LS7
| LEEDS
|Beck Hill, Buslingthorpe, Chapel Allerton, Chapeltown, Little London, Lovell Park, Meanwood, Miles Hill, Potternewton, Scott Hall, Sheepscar
| Leeds
|-
! LS8
| LEEDS
| Fearnville, Gipton, Gledhow, Harehills, Oakwood, Roundhay,  Moortown, 
| Leeds
|-
! LS9
| LEEDS 
| Burmantofts, Cross Green, East End Park, Gipton, Harehills, Mabgate, Osmondthorpe, Richmond Hill, Halton Moor
| Leeds
|-
! LS10
| LEEDS
| Belle Isle, Hunslet, Leeds city centre, Middleton, Stourton
| Leeds
|-
! LS11
| LEEDS
| Leeds city centre, Beeston, Beeston Hill, Cottingley, Holbeck
| Leeds
|-
! LS12
| LEEDS
| Armley, Farnley, New Farnley, Wortley 
| Leeds
|-
! LS13
| LEEDS
| Bramley, Gamble Hill, Moorside, Rodley, Swinnow
| Leeds
|-
! LS14
| LEEDS
| Fearnville, Killingbeck, Seacroft,  Scarcroft, Swarcliffe, Thorner, Whinmoor
| Leeds
|-
! LS15
| LEEDS
| Austhorpe, Barwick-in-Elmet, Colton, Cross Gates, Halton, Halton Moor, Manston, Pendas Fields, Scholes, Temple Newsam, Whitkirk, Killingbeck, Swarcliffe 
| Leeds
|-
! LS16
| LEEDS
| Adel, Bramhope, Cookridge, Eccup, Far Headingley, Holt Park, Ireland Wood, Lawnswood, Moor Grange, Tinshill, Weetwood, West Park
| Leeds
|-
! LS17
| LEEDS
| Alwoodley, Bardsey, East Keswick, Eccup, Harewood, Moortown, Shadwell, Slaid Hill, Weardley, Wike
| Leeds, Harrogate
|-
! LS18
| LEEDS
| Horsforth
| Leeds
|-
! LS19
| LEEDS
| Carlton, Rawdon, Yeadon
| Leeds
|-
! LS20
| LEEDS
| Guiseley, Hawksworth
| Leeds
|-
! LS21
| OTLEY
| Arthington, Otley, Pool, Blubberhouses
| Leeds, Harrogate
|-
! LS22
| WETHERBY
| Collingham, Linton, Wetherby
| Leeds, Harrogate
|-
! LS23
| WETHERBY
| Boston Spa, Bramham, Clifford, Thorp Arch, Walton
| Leeds, Harrogate
|-
! LS24
| TADCASTER
| Saxton, Stutton, Ulleskelf, Church Fenton, Oxton, Tadcaster, Toulston, Wighill, Ryther cum Ossendyke
| Selby, Harrogate
|-
! LS25
| LEEDS
| Aberford, Garforth, Hillam, Kippax, Ledsham, Micklefield, Monk Fryston, Sherburn-in-Elmet, South Milford
| Leeds, Selby
|-
! LS26
| LEEDS
| Great Preston, Methley, Mickletown, Oulton, Rothwell, Swillington, Woodlesford
| Leeds
|-
! LS27
| LEEDS
| Churwell, Gildersome, Morley
| Leeds
|-
! LS28
| PUDSEY
| Bagley, Calverley, Farsley, Fulneck, Pudsey, Stanningley
| Leeds
|-
! LS29
| ILKLEY
| Addingham, Ben Rhydding, Burley in Wharfedale, Burley Woodhead, Denton, Ilkley, Menston, Middleton
| Bradford, Harrogate
|-
!LS88
|LEEDS
|Jobcentre Plus
|Non-geographic
|-
! LS98
| |LEEDS
| First Direct
| Non-geographic
|-
! LS99
| LEEDS
| PO Boxes
| Non-geographic
|}

Map

See also
Postcode Address File
List of postcode areas in the United Kingdom

References

External links
Royal Mail's Postcode Address File
A quick introduction to Royal Mail's Postcode Address File (PAF)

Leeds
Postcode areas covering Yorkshire and the Humber